Meymanat Rural District is in Golestan District of Baharestan County, Tehran province, Iran. At the National Census of 2006, its population (as a part of Robat Karim County) was 7,107 in 1,691 households. There were 8,258 inhabitants in 2,116 households at the following census of 2011, by which time the district, together with Bostan District, had been separated from the county and Baharestan County established. At the most recent census of 2016, the population of the rural district was 7,353 in 2,043 households. The largest of its two villages was Meymanatabad, with 5,821 people. The village of Riyeh had a population of 1,532.

References 

Baharestan County

Rural Districts of Tehran Province

Populated places in Tehran Province

Populated places in Baharestan County